Jenny Kronish (born 27 December 1996) is an American rugby union player. She plays for Harlequins in the Premier 15s.

Kronish made her international debut for the United States against England in 2021.

Kronish was named in the Eagles squad for the 2022 Pacific Four Series in New Zealand. She was selected in the Eagles squad for the 2021 Rugby World Cup in New Zealand.

She played collegiately at Harvard University.

References

External links 
 Eagles Profile

Living people
1996 births
Female rugby union players
American female rugby union players
United States women's international rugby union players
Harvard Crimson rugby players
Harvard College alumni